Puzzle is the debut album of the alternative rock group dada, released in 1992, on I.R.S. Records.  The album featured the hit single "Dizz Knee Land" and sold more than half a million copies. It spent 10 weeks on the Billboard 200 chart, peaking at #111. On July 13, 2004, the album was reissued with bonus tracks by Blue Cave Records.

Track listing
1992 I.R.S. Records Edition (Original release)
All songs written by Joie Calio and Michael Gurley except as noted.
"Dorina" – 6:06
"Mary Sunshine Rain" (Calio, Gurley, Phil Leavitt) – 4:39
"Dog" – 4:13
"Dizz Knee Land" (Calio, Gurley, Leavitt)– 4:06
"Surround" – 3:38
"Here Today, Gone Tomorrow" – 4:42
"Posters" – 4:05
"Timothy" – 4:00
"Dim" (Calio, Gurley, Leavitt) – 4:21
"Who You Are" – 3:24
"Puzzle" (Calio, Gurley, Leavitt) – 6:20
"Moon" - 5:18

2004 Blue Cave Records Edition (Reissued release)
"Dorina"
"Mary Sunshine Rain"
"Dog"
"Dizz Knee Land"
"Surround"
"Here Today, Gone Tomorrow"
"Posters"
"Timothy"
"Dim"
"Who You Are"
"Puzzle"
"Moon"
"Colour" [Bonus Track]
"Opera" [Bonus Track]
"Little Way" [Bonus Track]
"Here Today, Gone Tomorrow" [Bonus Video]

Personnel

dada
Joie Calio - Guitars, Bass, Percussion, Vocals
Michael Gurley - Guitars, Keyboards, Vocals
Phil Leavitt - Drums, Percussion, Vocals

Additional musicians
Robert Becker - Viola
Henry Corbett - Cello
Bruce Dukov - Violin

Production
Produced By dada & Ken Scott
Recorded & Engineered By Eddie Ashworth, Steve Cormier & Ken Scott
Assistant Engineers: Jan Hovet, Melissa Sewell
Mixed By dada, Ken Scott & Eddie Ashworth
Mastered By Stephen Marcussen
Art Direction and Design By Dale Lavi

References

1992 debut albums
I.R.S. Records albums
Albums produced by Ken Scott
Dada (band) albums